Ola is a ghost town and railroad siding in eastern Elko County, Nevada, United States.

Description
Other than a railroad siding, almost nothing remains at the site.

References

External links

Ghost towns in Elko County, Nevada
Ghost towns in Nevada